Pho 75 is chain of restaurants that serve pho (Vietnamese beef noodle soup) in the Washington, D.C. and Philadelphia, Pennsylvania areas. Not only does it serve soup, but it also serves special desserts and Vietnamese coffee as well. It has branches in Arlington, VA, Falls Church, VA, Herndon, VA, Langley Park, MD, Hyattsville, MD, Rockville, MD and Philadelphia.

See also
 List of Vietnamese restaurants

References 

Asian-American culture in Maryland
Asian-American culture in Pennsylvania
Asian-American culture in Virginia
Asian-American culture in Washington, D.C.
Pho
Regional restaurant chains in the United States
Restaurants in Maryland
Restaurants in Pennsylvania
Restaurants in Virginia
Restaurants in Washington, D.C.
Vietnamese restaurants in the United States